Barrhill is a village in South Ayrshire, Scotland with a population of approximately 400 in 2001.

While the surrounding area is predominantly agricultural land, the main local employer is Barr Construction Ltd. Local amenities include a village store and a Public House, "The Trout Inn", formerly known as "The Commercial Hotel". On Main Street, in the centre of the village is Barrhill Bowling Club, affectionately known to locals as "The BBC".

The Cross Water (a tributary of the River Stinchar – not to be confused with the Cross Water of Luce) flows through the village.

Barrhill Primary School serves the local population, providing education for 5–11 year olds. In the 2006/7 academic year it had a roll of 34 pupils.

Black Clauchrie House is a manor house and former hunting lodge, located just outside Barrhill. The house's architecture and decoration are a notable example of the Edwardian Arts and Crafts Movement.

Kildonan House is an impressive early 20th century mansion and former convent school, located slightly north of Barrhill. Originally constructed as the home of Euan Wallace MP.

Transport
Barrhill lies on the A714 road between Girvan and Newton Stewart.
This station featured in The Five Red Herrings, a 1931 Lord Peter Wimsey detective novel by Dorothy L Sayers.

Local history
In 1665, by the side of Cross Water in Barrhill, John Murchie and Daniel Mieklewrick were found by soldiers to be in possession of Bibles and assumed to be Covenanters and shot to death.  They were buried on the spot, and a memorial was built, known as "The Martyrs' Tomb".

References 

Villages in Carrick, Scotland